Jan Willem van Ede (born 13 April 1963 in Utrecht) is a retired Dutch football goalkeeper.

Playing career

Club
He played the majority of his career for hometown club FC Utrecht and as of 2017, still holds the record of most Eredivisie games played for the club with 409. He made his professional debut on 8 September 1982 for Utrecht against PEC Zwolle and won the 1985 KNVB Cup with the club.

He later became reserve goalkeeper at PSV and FC Twente and also played for Haarlem in the Eerste Divisie and NAC.

Hoekman case
In 1999, Van Ede was sentenced to pay a compensation after kicking Roda JC winger Danny Hoekman 10 years earlier, which took Hoekman out of the game for almost two years due to a knee injury.

Coaching career
Van Ede worked as assistant and goalkeeper coach of the Netherlands women from 2005 but was dismissed in summer 2016 due to a difference in view with manager Arjan van der Laan. Next to his job with the Dutch FA, he was appointed coach of amateur side Montfoort in December 2015.

In September 2019 van Ede was appointed the Republic of Ireland Women's team goalkeeping coach, reuniting with manager Vera Pauw.

Statistics 

Last update: 4 December 2008

Honours
FC Utrecht
 KNVB Cup: 1984–85

References

External links
 Career stats

1963 births
Living people
Dutch footballers
Footballers from Utrecht (city)
Association football goalkeepers
FC Utrecht players
PSV Eindhoven players
HFC Haarlem players
NAC Breda players
FC Twente players
Eredivisie players
Eerste Divisie players
Dutch expatriate sportspeople in Sweden